MKS Ślepsk Suwałki, officially known for sponsorship reasons as Ślepsk Malow Suwałki, is a professional men's volleyball club based in Suwałki in northeastern Poland. Initially, the club was founded in 2004 in Augustów, moved to Suwałki in 2009. The club was promoted to the highest level of the Polish Volleyball League in 2019.

Team
As of 2022–23 season

Coaching staff
Players

Former names

See also

References

External links
 Official website 
 Team profile at PlusLiga.pl 
 Team profile at Volleybox.net

Polish volleyball clubs
Sport in Podlaskie Voivodeship
Volleyball clubs established in 2004
2004 establishments in Poland